Natsukawa (written: 夏川) is a Japanese surname.  People with the name include:
 , Japanese gravure idol
 , Japanese folk singer
 , Japanese actress

Japanese-language surnames